Cercotmetus is a genus of water bugs in the subfamily Ranatrinae ("water stick-insects").  The recorded distribution of this genus is from is from mainland Asia to New Guinea and northern Australia.

Description
Cercotmetus species are similar to the related genus Ranatra, but have distinctly shorter respiratory siphons (posterior breathing tubes, which are ¼ or less of the body length) and the front femur is shorter than length of the pronotum.

Species
The Global Biodiversity Information Facility lists:
 Cercotmetus asiaticus Amyot & Serville, 1843 - type species
 Cercotmetus brevipes Montandon, 1909
 Cercotmetus compositus Montandon, 1903
 Cercotmetus dissidens Montandon, 1911
 Cercotmetus fumosus Distant, 1904
 Cercotmetus horni Montandon, 1911
 Cercotmetus minutus Keffer & J.Polhemus, 1999
 Cercotmetus pilipes (Dallas, 1850)
 Cercotmetus robustus Montandon, 1911
 Cercotmetus strangulatus Montandon, 1911

References

External links

Nepidae
Nepomorpha genera
Hemiptera of Asia